Ekaterina Nagy von Cziser, better known by her stage name Käthe von Nagy (4 April 1904 – 20 December 1973), was a Hungarian actress, model, dancer, and singer who worked in the German and French cinema.

Early life and education
Käthe von Nagy, the daughter of a wealthy bank manager and part of an aristocratic Serbian family, spent very little time at monastery school.

When she wanted to get married at age 16, her parents did not approve and placed her in the Sancta Christiana Convent in Frohsdorf near Vienna to prevent this early marriage. After 18 months in the convent, she went to high school in Vienna, and then finally to boarding school. During this period, she took riding and fencing lessons.

Career 
As a young adult, Nagy's dream was to become an author, also unusual for a woman of her time. She went to Budapest, where she wrote a few short articles that were eventually published in a magazine. Shortly after this, she decided to pursue her interest in acting and enrolled in the acting school of Béla Gáal, near Budapest. There she learned acting, dancing, and singing. Her parents were unhappy about her change of career and frequent moves. To satisfy her parents (especially her father), she returned and worked with him in his bank for a period of time, while secretly writing novels.

In 1926, Nagy moved to Berlin to pursue a career in the film industry, but, as she was then unknown, she took a position as correspondent for the Hungarian newspaper Pesti Hírlap to earn a living. After numerous futile applications in the city, Hungarian film director Alexander Korda got her a role as an actress in the 1927 comedy film Männer vor der Ehe, opposite her future husband, Constantin J. David. Soon after, in 1928, she starred in the successful Wien, die Stadt meiner Träume ("Vienna, City of My Dreams"), which made her known as the "up-and-coming young actress of the European cinema". She later appeared in many leading roles and became famous for her countless postcards which also benefitted her modeling career. In 1931, she starred in Le Capitaine Craddock, which made her notable in France where she would later make half her movies. From 1937 onwards, she was mainly in French-speaking roles, but also appeared in Italian and Austrian film productions. Her last film was the German film The Forester's Daughter, in 1952, alongside Johanna Matz.

During the Second World War, Nagy virtually retired from the acting industry, appearing in only one movie, Mahlia la métisse. Because of her notability due to her famous and hugely popular postcards, she was, in 1940, reportedly approached by Reichsführer-SS, Heinrich Himmler, who asked her to be the face and body for sex dolls provided to German soldiers as a way to combat syphilis at the front, but she refused. This story has come to be considered a hoax, due to the lack of reliable sources backing it up.

Personal life 
Nagy's first marriage was to film director Constantin J. David, in 1927, the same year they met. Her second marriage was to Jacques Fattini; little is known about their relationship and marriage. She died of cancer in 1973, in Ojai, California, aged 69.

Filmography

References

External links 
 "Käthe von Nagy" at Internet Movie Database
 "Käthe von Nagy – 1935 Pictures" at Madamedepompadour
 "Käthe von Nagy Biography" at Virtual History

1904 births
1973 deaths
Actors from Subotica
People from the Kingdom of Hungary
Hungarian film actresses
Hungarian silent film actresses
20th-century Hungarian actresses